785 Records is a record label located in New York, United States, founded in 2005 by songwriter Denise Rich. The label's first release was the charity single Come Together Now, written by Rich, Sharon Stone, Mark Feist and Damon Sharpe from which the proceeds went to benefit the victims of Hurricane Katrina.

Marc Eichner, a senior executive at RCA/BMG, joined the label as president in August 2006. The label built a $1 million recording studio in Rich's Fifth Avenue penthouse in Manhattan overlooking Central Park in 2007.

Bands/Artists under the label 
 Article A
 Tiffany Giardina
 At First Blush!

See also 
 Record Label
 List of record labels

References

External links
 785 Records 

2005 establishments in New York City
2000s in Manhattan
Companies based in Manhattan
Entertainment companies based in New York City
New York (state) record labels
Record labels established in 2005